Sándor Katona is a Hungarian glider aerobatic pilot.

He is a professional aerobatics instructor and competed in most World and European Glider Aerobatic Championships.
The Fédération Aéronautique Internationale (FAI) awarded him the Paul Tissandier Diploma in 1992, and the Léon Biancotto Aerobatics Diploma in 2006.

References

Aerobatic pilots
Glider pilots
Flight instructors
Living people
Year of birth missing (living people)